Arnold Zoltan Merkies (born 6 December 1968 in Bodegraven) is a Dutch politician. As a member of the Socialist Party (Socialistische Partij) he was an MP between 20 September 2012 and 23 March 2017.

Merkies studied economics at the University of Amsterdam. He is married and lives in Amsterdam, and is a brother of PvdA politician Judith Merkies.

References 

1968 births
Living people
Members of the House of Representatives (Netherlands)
Politicians from Amsterdam
People from Bodegraven
Socialist Party (Netherlands) politicians
University of Amsterdam alumni
21st-century Dutch politicians